

Antenor (Antḗnōr;  BC) was an Athenian sculptor. He is recorded as the creator of the joint statues of the tyrannicides Harmodius and Aristogeiton funded by the Athenians on the expulsion of Hippias. These statues were carried away to Susa by Xerxes I of Persia during the Greco-Persian Wars. Archaeologists have also established that a basis signed by "Antenor son of Eumares" belonged to a set of female figures in an archaic style which were displayed in the acropolis. The sculptor of the Harmodius and Aristogeiton is usually listed as the son of Euphranor.

See also
Harmodius and Aristogeiton
Harmodius and Aristogeiton in sculpture
Antenor Kore
Severe style
Ancient Greek sculpture

Notes

References
 
 
 
 

Ancient Athenian sculptors
6th-century BC Greek sculptors
Ancient Greek sculptors
Archaic Athens